Kaye Breadsell (born 2 January 1942), also known as Kaye Brajkovich, is an Australian gymnast. She competed in five events at the 1960 Summer Olympics.

References

External links
 
 

1942 births
Living people
Australian female artistic gymnasts
Olympic gymnasts of Australia
Gymnasts at the 1960 Summer Olympics
Sportspeople from Perth, Western Australia
20th-century Australian women